The Financial Supervision Commission (FSC) was the financial regulator of the Isle of Man.

The commission was established in 1983.  The Chairman was previously a Member of Tynwald until legislation forbade this in 2004.

In 2015, the FSC merged with the Insurance and Pensions Authority (IPA) to form the Financial Services Authority (IOMFSA).

Chairpersons
FSC
Col Edgar Mann, 1983-1985
David Cannan MHK, 1986-1989
Donald Gelling, 1989-1996
Walter Gilbey, 1996-1999
Phil Braidwood MHK, 1999-2001
Alan Crowe MLC, 2001-2003
Rosemary Penn, 2004-2012
Geoff Karran, 2012-2015

IOMFSA
Geoff Karran, 2015-2018
Lillian Boyle, since 2018

References

External links

Economy of the Isle of Man
Government of the Isle of Man
Isle of Man